La Guzmán is a Spanish-language biographical television series produced by Sony Pictures Television and Imagen Televisión inspired by the life of iconic Mexican superstar Alejandra Guzmán. The series is directed by Mauricio Cruz and produced by Andrés Santamaría, and stars Majida Issa as the titular character, along with Carmen Madrid as Silvia Pinal. It premiered on 21 January 2019 and ended on 11 April 2019.

Cast

Main 
 Majida Issa as Alejandra Guzmán
 Erick Elías as Santiago Torrieri
 Carmen Madrid as Silvia Pinal
 Esteban Soberanes as Emilio Guzmán
 Ana Patricia Rojo as María de los Ángeles Torrieri
 Carla Carrillo as Renata
 Aleyda Gallardo as Nana Tere
 Carlos Aragón as Carlos
 Manuel Masalva as Luis Enrique Guzmán
 Salvador Amaya as Nacho Escalante
 Paula Serrano as Raquel
 Florencia Ríos as Paty
 Roberto Mateos as Lienzo
 Giuseppe Gamba
 Vicente Tamayo
 Neno Villegas
 Roberto Mateos
 Vanessa Ciangherotti as Desiree
 Elsa Jaimes as Olga

Recurring 
 Paloma Ruiz de Alda as Cynthia
 Sofía Garza

Ratings 
   
}}

Episodes

References

External links 
 

2010s Mexican drama television series
2019 Mexican television series debuts
2019 Mexican television series endings
Television series based on singers and musicians
Spanish-language television shows
Imagen Televisión original programming
Sony Pictures Television telenovelas